BGM is the fourth studio album by Yellow Magic Orchestra, released on March 21, 1981. The title stands for "Background music", though Japanese TV and press advertising alternately used "Beautiful Grotesque Music". This album was produced by Haruomi Hosono. Recording started on January 15, 1981, in an effort to release the album by March 21, 1981. The album was the first of any kind to feature the Roland TR-808, one of the earliest programmable drum machines; YMO had already been the first band to use the device, featuring it on-stage as early as 1980. In addition to the TR-808, this was also their first studio album recorded with the Roland MC-4 Microcomposer.

Overview
Alfa Records, YMO's record company, had installed a 3M 32-track digital recorder in its studio shortly before YMO started recording BGM. Since Hosono was not fond of its overly sharp sound quality, he recorded all the rhythm sections for BGM on a TASCAM 80-8 analog recorder first and copied them with the 3M machine, resulting in the fuller, much compressed rhythm tracks. Unfortunately, no known working samples of the 3M recorder exist in Japan today, making it quite difficult to play the master tape.

One of the earliest uses of the TR-808 for a live performance was by Yellow Magic Orchestra in 1980 for the song "1000 Knives", an electro rendition of member Ryuichi Sakamoto's "Thousand Knives" (1978). The hand-clap sound was later publicized on this album, being used again on "1000 Knives" and in "Music Plans", another of Sakamoto's songs.

Peter Barakan debuts as YMO's co-lyricist; he had previously provided lyrics for Ryuichi Sakamoto's solo track "Thatness and Thereness". Sakamoto himself was often absent from the BGM recording sessions due to creative differences with Hosono, and he turns in "Music Plans" as his only new composition for the album, since "1000 Knives" (from his 1978 debut album The Thousand Knives of Ryuichi Sakamoto) and "Happy End" were new recordings of his earlier materials. Another song, "Rap Phenomena", was an early attempt at electronic rap. "Loom" is a re-working of "The Infinite Space Octave" by YMO computer programmer Hideki Matsutake, and features a slow, upward glissando similar to the Deep Note, THX's audio logo. A similar sound was previously used by YMO members Haruomi Hosono and Ryuichi Sakamoto for their 1978 album Cochin Moon. Like most YMO albums, song titles were printed in both Japanese and English, as listed below. "来たるべきもの" more accurately translates to "What should come".

Reception

When released in 1981, the album's reception was positive. Stereo Review described the recording as "crystalline" and the performance as "the twain meet", praising the album for its "remarkable" blend between "East and West", its "catchy tunes", its "ambitious collection of electronics" and for "pushing at the frontiers of electronic rock", but noted that this affected the album's accessibility.

Track listing

 All CDs released between 1984 and 1998 feature an alternate take of "Happy End", with audible differences throughout the second half of the track. The original version appears on all CD and later vinyl releases from 1999 onwards.

Personnel

Yellow Magic Orchestra – Arrangements, Electronics, Vocals, Voices on "U•T", Mixing engineers
Haruomi Hosono – Bass, Synth Bass, Keyboards, Delays & Harmonizer on "U•T", Production
Ryuichi Sakamoto – Keyboards, Vocoder
Yukihiro Takahashi – Drums, Electronic drums

Guest musicians
Hideki Matsutake – Programming
Takeshii Fujii, Don Nagata & Tomoki Miyadera – Equipment Coordination
Peter Barakan – Lyrics, spoken words on "Mass"
Tomoko Nunoi (uncredited) – French Narration on "Ballet"

Staff
Kunihiko Murai & Shōrō Kawazoe – Executive Producer
Mitsuo Koike – Recording & Mixing engineer
Yoshifumi Īo – Recording Engineer
Kazusuke Obi – A&R Coordinator
Plan-New Werk & Tsukuitoshinao – Creative Services
Masayoshi Sukita – Photography

References

1981 albums
Yellow Magic Orchestra albums
Alfa Records albums